Sam C. Guess (August 8, 1909 – June 20, 1989) was an American politician in the state of Washington. He served in the Washington State Senate from 1963 to 1987.

The Division Street Bridge in Spokane is officially named the Senator Sam C. Guess Memorial Bridge in his honor.

References

1989 deaths
1909 births
People from Greenwood, Mississippi
Republican Party Washington (state) state senators
20th-century American politicians